Valentine Laura Chandor (1875–1935) was an American educator. 

She was born in New York City in 1875, the eldest child of John Arthur Chandor and his first wife Adeline Augusta Dickinson (1850–1947).

Chandor taught at the Charlton School in New York City, which the Rockefeller Foundation purchased in 1917, and turned into Lincoln School. After Charlton parents persuaded her, Chandor up on her own with 40 girls at East 62nd Street, the Chandor School.  The pupil roll grew to 100 girls, chosen "for character and breeding sooner than wealth", and in 1932, Chandor described by Time magazine as "able proprietress of the foremost remaining small school for New York fashionables" agreed to become head of Spence School, merging its 176 pupil roll with her own.

According to Time magazine, after Chandor's death in autumn 1935, Spence School was "again heading up", and she was succeeded as headmistress by Miss Dorothy Brockway.

References

1875 births
1935 deaths
American educators
American school principals
People from New York City